The Frank P. Brown Medal was formerly awarded by the Franklin Institute for excellence in science, engineering, and structures.  It was established by the 1938 will of Franklin Pierce Brown, a member of the Master Plumbers Association.

The designer of the medal was Walker Kirtland Hancock.

Laureates
1941 – Willis Haviland Carrier Engineering
1942 – Duff Andrew Abrams Engineering
1943 – Albert Kahn Engineering
1944 – Harvey Clayton Rentschler Engineering
1945 – David Gilmore Clarke Engineering
1946 – Karl Terzaghi Earth Science
1947 – Karl P. Billner Engineering
1950 – Gustave Magnel Engineering
1950 – Eugene Freyssinet Engineering
1951 – Samuel Arnold Greeley Civil Engineering
1952 – Fred N. Severud Engineering
1953 – Frank Lloyd Wright Engineering
1954 – Edmund Germer Engineering
1954 – Hans J. Spanner Engineering
1954 – Humboldt W. Leverenz Engineering
1955 – Charles S. Leopold Engineering
1956 – Robert G. Letourneau Engineering
1957 - Pier Luigi Nervi Engineering 
1958 - Charles Milton Spofford  Engineering  (author of The Theory of Structures 1915)
1959 - Hardy Cross Engineering  
1960 - Richard Buckminster Fuller Engineering 
1961 - Charles Edouard Jeanneret LeCorbusier Engineering  
1962 - Edmund Norwood Bacon Civil Engineering
1964 - Louis I. Kahn Engineering 
1965 - William Jaird Levitt Engineering  
1966 - Bolt, Beranek and Newman, Inc. Engineering 
1967 - Carl Koch (architect) Engineering
1968 - Philip Newell Youtz Engineering 
1970 - Trevor Lloyd Wadley Engineering 
1971 - Henry Lee Willet Engineering  
1974 - Hans Liebherr Engineering
1975 - Public Building Services of U.S. Govt Engineering 
1976 - E. Dale Waters Engineering   
1978 - Henry J. Degenkolb Engineering
1982 - Vincent G. Kling Engineering  
1982 - Lynn S. Beedle Engineering 
1987 - Paul Weidlinger Engineering  
1988 - Ben C. Gerwick, Jr. Engineering  
1988 - Marvin A. Mass Engineering 
1992 – John W. Fisher Engineering
1995 – Jean M. Muller Engineering
Now dormant as an award. The last Frank P. Brown Medal was awarded in 1995.

See also

 List of engineering awards

References

Franklin Institute awards
Engineering awards
Awards disestablished in 1988
Awards established in 1941